Sideshow is a 1950 American crime film directed by Jean Yarbrough and starring Don McGuire.

Plot
A treasury agent (McGuire) goes undercover at a carnival to catch jewel smugglers. He gains the help of a ticket seller (Tracey Roberts) and a performer (Eddie Quillan) to catch the culprits.

Cast
Don McGuire as Steve Arthur
Tracey Roberts as Dolly Jordan
John Abbott as Pierre
Eddie Quillan as Big Top
Ray Walker as Sam Owen
Dick Foote as Deke
Jimmy Conlin as Johnny
Iris Adrian as Nellie
Ted Hecht Wille

Production 
William F. Brody wrote the story, and Sam Rocca adapted it for film. Brody was the producer, and Jean Yarbrough was the director for the Monogram production.

References

External links
 
 

1950 films
Circus films
American crime films
1950 crime films
American black-and-white films
1950s English-language films
Films directed by Jean Yarbrough
1950s American films